Dhotikol  is a village in the southern state of Karnataka, India It is located in Chincholi taluk of Kalaburagi district. It belongs to karakmukli grampanchayat.

Demographics
As of 2011 India census Dhotikol had a population of 1461 with 679 males and 782 females.

Agriculture
Major Crops produced in the Dhotikol are Pigeon pea, Sorghum, Pearl millet, chickpea, mung bean, vigna mungo.

Transport
KSRTC bus facility is available to travel within the Karnataka state and Nabour states. The nearest railway station is (47 km) tandur railway station TDU . The nearest airport is (159 km) Rajiv Gandhi International Airport.

See also
 Gulbarga
 Districts of Karnataka

References

External links
 http://Gulbarga.nic.in

Villages in Kalaburagi district